Enrico Saroldi (March 19, 1878 – 1954) was an Italian sculptor and medallist.

Saroldi was born in Carmagnola.  He was primarily a monumental sculptor, and his works may be seen throughout Italy in churches and public places.  Saroldi studied at the Brera in Milan under Enrico Butti, and lived and worked for the duration of his career in Milan, where he died.

References
Catalogue of the International Exhibition of Contemporary Medals, 1910.

1878 births
1954 deaths
People from the Province of Turin
20th-century Italian sculptors
20th-century Italian male artists
Italian male sculptors
Brera Academy alumni